Vitamin R may refer to:
Methylphenidate, also known as Ritalin or Vitamin R
"Vitamin R (Leading Us Along)", a song by Chevelle
Rainier Beer, a popular brand of beer in the Pacific Northwest of the United States